KF Dardanët is a professional football club from Kosovo which competes in the Second League. The club is based in Gjakovë. Their home ground is the Gjakova City Stadium which has a seating capacity of 6,000.

See also
 List of football clubs in Kosovo

References

Football clubs in Kosovo
Association football clubs established in 1991
Sport in Gjakova